Elliot Francis Gerson (born July 15, 1952) is an American nonprofit executive, formerly a lawyer, business executive and state and federal government official. He is executive vice president of The Aspen Institute, and the American Secretary of The Rhodes Trust.

Education and Early Life

Born in New Haven, Connecticut he was an undergraduate at Harvard University, a Rhodes Scholar who studied at Magdalen College in Oxford, and a law student at Yale Law School. He was a US Supreme Court clerk, practiced law in government and privately, held executive positions in state and federal government and on a presidential campaign, and was president of start-ups in health care and education, and of two insurance and health-care companies.

Career

Gerson is the executive vice president of the Aspen Institute, a nonpartisan organization based in Washington, D.C. He is responsible for its Public Programs, Policy Programs and International Partners. He is also the American Secretary to the Rhodes Trust, responsible for the Rhodes Scholarships in the United States.

Law

Gerson’s career has included work as a civilian assistant to the U.S. Secretary of Defense Harold Brown in the Carter Administration, during which time he was awarded the Defense Meritorious Civilian Service Medal. He was Special Assistant to the Secretary of Health, Education and Welfare (now the Department of Health and Human Services), Joseph Califano, in the Carter Administration. He was a clerk to Judge Harold Leventhal of the United States Court of Appeals for the D.C. Circuit, and also clerk to Justice Potter Stewart of the Supreme Court of the United States.

Deputy Attorney General of Connecticut 

He practiced law as the Deputy Attorney General of Connecticut where he argued cases including in the State and U.S. Supreme Courts, and briefly before that in private practice in Hartford, CT and Washington, D.C. 

Financial Services Industry

Mr. Gerson then entered the financial services industry where he rose to Executive Vice President of The Travelers Corporation and President of its managed healthcare and health insurance business, and was briefly Executive Vice President for successor companies MetraHealth and United Health Care. He subsequently led smaller start-up companies in technology and specialized health care. 

Policy Director, Finance Chair, Joseph Lieberman campaign

Gerson worked as Policy Director then Finance Chair in the 2004 presidential campaign of Senator Joseph I. Lieberman.

Mandela Rhodes Foundation, the Äänit Prize

In 2003, Gerson and colleagues met with former South African President Nelson Mandela, regarding the establishment of a new foundation focused on expanding opportunities for Africans in higher education. This became the Mandela Rhodes Foundation which offers young leaders from across the African continent a chance to become part of Nelson Mandela’s legacy of transformative impact. In 2021 Gerson Chaired the Judges' Panel of the Foundation’s inaugural Äänit Prize, which supports initiatives that can deliver positive social impact for Africa’s most marginalized populations.

American Secretary, The Rhodes Trust

Mr. Gerson is the American Secretary to The Rhodes Trust and administers the Rhodes Scholarships in the United States.  The earliest and arguably most famous of all international scholarships, the Rhodes Scholarships offer two to four years of funding to attend the University of Oxford in the United Kingdom. Gerson was appointed by Trust CEO and Warden Sir Anthony Kenny in 1998 as its fifth American Secretary, following David Alexander. In 2014, for his contribution to the University of Oxford, Gerson was recognized as a "Distinguished Friend of Oxford.” He also serves on the Scholarship Committee of the Rhodes Trustees. Prior to becoming American Secretary, Gerson was Connecticut Secretary and District I member for over a decade, and Assistant Secretary to the Trust under then Secretary William J. Barber from 1977 to 1979. 

Arts, Humanities and Social Services 

Active over his career in a wide range of community activities, particularly in the arts, humanities and social services, Elliot Gerson served as president of the Hartford Stage Company, president of The Hartford Courant Foundation, and trustee of Connecticut Public Broadcasting Network. He also served as a director of the Connecticut Humanities Council, the Connecticut Historical Society, the Connecticut Women’s Education and Legal Foundation, and the Connecticut Civil Liberties Union. 

Additionally, Gerson was a trustee of The Shakespeare Theatre in Washington, D.C., and was a member of its Executive Committee. He was a trustee of the Bazelon Center for Mental Health Law, and is a Council on Foreign Relations member. He was also the chair of the first selection committee of the George J. Mitchell Scholarships for U.S. college graduates to study at Irish universities, a program modeled on the Rhodes Scholarships.

Board Service 

Mr Gerson has served on many non-profit boards and advisory committees, especially in the arts. His current Board service includes The Aspen Institute International Partners in Germany, Japan, Ukraine, Mexico, New Zealand, and the United Kingdom. He also serves on the board of the Service Year Alliance, that is dedicated to expanding opportunities for civilian national service in the United States.  

Personal Life  

Mr. Gerson’s father was Louis L. Gerson, who was born in Tomaszow Lubelski, Poland in 1921. He earned his PhD at Yale and was a professor of Political Science at the University of Connecticut, and its department chair.  

His mother, Elizabeth Shanley Gerson, was born in New York City in 1928 of Irish immigrants, and was soon orphaned. She earned her B. A. and Master of Social Work at the University of Connecticut and practiced as a geriatric social worker. In 1997, the Gerson Family endowed the Elizabeth Shanley Gerson Irish Literature Reading at the University of Connecticut, to bring an Irish writer to the University every year.

Mr. Gerson’s siblings include William Gerson and Ann Swanson. He has five children and two stepchildren: Emily Rosenthal, Hilary Axtmayer, Alexander Gerson, Marissa Newton, Jillian Gerson, Diana Ryan and Julia Ryan. He is a resident of Snowmass Village, Colorado, as well as Washington, D. C., and La Paz, BCS, Mexico.

See also 
 List of law clerks of the Supreme Court of the United States (Seat 8)

References

Alumni of Magdalen College, Oxford
American Rhodes Scholars
Harvard University alumni
1952 births
Yale Law School alumni
Law clerks of the Supreme Court of the United States
Living people